The men's 4 × 400 metres relay event at the 1948 Olympic Games took place on 6 and 7 August. The United States team won the final with a time of 3:10.4.

Records
Prior to the competition, the existing World and Olympic records were as follows.

Schedule
All times are British Summer Time (UTC+1)

Results

Round 1
The first two teams in each heat qualified for the Final.

Heat 1

Heat 2

Heat 3

Final

Key: DNF = Did not finish

References

Men's 4x400 metre relay
Relay foot races at the Olympics
Men's events at the 1948 Summer Olympics